Afghanistan is a landlocked mountainous country located on the Iranian Plateau, at the crossroads of Central Asia and South Asia. The country is the 40th largest in the world in size. Kabul is the capital and largest city of Afghanistan, located in the Kabul Province. With a location at the intersection of major trade routes, Afghanistan has attracted a succession of invaders since the sixth century BCE.

Afghanistan contains most of the Hindu Kush. There are a number of major rivers in the country, including Amu Darya, Arghandab, Farah, Hari, Helmand, Kabul, Kokcha, and Kunar. The country also possesses many smaller rivers as well as streams, canals, lakes, ponds, and springs. Most of its fresh water has been historically flowing into neighboring countries.

Climate

Rainfall in Afghanistan is very scarce, and mainly only affects the northern highlands, arriving in March and April. Rainfall in the more arid lowlands is rare, and can be very unpredictable.  Marked characteristics are the great differences of summer and winter temperature and of day and night temperature, as well as the extent to which change of climate can be attained by slight change of place. The Afghan climate is a dry one. The sun shines for three-fourths of the year, and the nights are clearer than the days.

Taking the highlands of the country as a whole, there is no great difference between the mean temperature of Afghanistan and that of the lower Himalaya. However, a remarkable feature of the Afghan climate is its extreme temperature range within limited periods. The smallest daily range in the north is when the weather is cold; the greatest is when it is hot. For seven months of the year (from May to November) this range exceeds 17 °C (31 °F) daily. Oral tradition tells of the destruction of the entire population of Ghazni by snowstorms on more than one occasion.

The summer heat is strong in the Sistan Basin, Jalalabad and Turkestan. The simoom wind occurs in Kandahar province during the summer. The hot season is rendered more intense by frequent dust storms and strong winds; whilst the bare rocky ridges that traverse the country, absorbing heat by day and radiating it by night, render the summer nights most oppressive. In Kabul the heat is tempered occasionally by cool breezes from the Hindu Kush, and the nights are usually cool. In Kandahar snow seldom falls on the plains or lower hills; when it does, it melts at once.

The combination of hot summers and bitterly cold winters has been noted comparable to the U.S. state of Wyoming.

The summer rains that accompany the southwest monsoon in India, beat along the southern slopes of the Himalaya, and travel up the Kabul valley as far as Laghman, though they are more clearly felt in Bajour and Panjkora, under the Hindu Kush, and in the eastern branches of Safed Koh. Rain also falls at this season at the head of Kurram valley. South of this the Suliman mountains may be taken as the western limit of the monsoon's action. It is not felt in the rest of Afghanistan, in which, as in the rest of western Asia, the winter rains and snow are the most considerable. The spring rain, though less copious, is more important to agriculture than the winter rain, unless where the latter falls in the form of snow. In the absence of monsoon influences there are steadier weather indications than in India. The north-west blizzards which occur in winter and spring are the most noticeable feature, and their influence is clearly felt on the Indian frontier.

Examples

Mountain systems

Of the ranges extending southwestward from the Hindu Kush, the Foladi peak (Shah Foladi) of the Baba mountain range (Koh-i-Baba) reaches the greatest height: . The Safed Koh range, which includes the Tora Bora area, dominates the border area southeast of Kabul.

Important passes include the Unai Pass across the Safed Koh, the Kushan and Salang Passes through the Hindu Kush, and the Khyber Pass that connects Afghanistan with Pakistan. Other key passages through the mountainous Pakistan border include two from Paktika Province into Pakistan's Waziristan region: one at Angoor Ada, and one further south at the Gumal River crossing, plus the Charkai River passage south of Khost, Afghanistan, at Pakistan's Ghulam Khan village into North Waziristan. The busy Pak-Afghan border crossing at Wesh, Afghanistan is in a flat and dry area, though this route involves Pakistan's Khojak Pass at  just  from the border. The border connects Kandahar and Spin Boldak in Afghanistan with Quetta in Pakistan.

The Wakhan Corridor in the northeast lies eastward of the province of Panjshir, between the Hindu Kush and the Pamir Mountains, which leads to the Wakhjir Pass into Xinjiang in China. In Kabul, and over all the northern part of the country to the descent at Gandamak, winter is rigorous, especially so on the high Arachosian plateau. 

Although Herat is approximately  lower than Kandahar, the summer climate there is more temperate along with the yearly climate. From May to September, the wind blows from the northwest with great force, and this extends across the country to Kandahar. The winter is mild; snow melts as it falls, and even on the mountains does not lie long. Three years out of four at Herat it does not freeze hard enough for the people to store ice. Yet, it was not very far from Herat, in Rafir Kala, in 1750, where Ahmad Shah's army, retreating from Persia, is said to have lost 18,000 men from cold in a single night. The eastern reaches of the Hari River, including the rapids, are frozen hard in the winter, and people travel on it as on a road.

Rivers, streams and lakes

Afghanistan receives snow between November and March, which gradually melts into numerous rivers, streams, canals, lakes, ponds, and springs, but most of the country's fresh water continues to flow into neighboring countries. It loses about two-thirds of its water to neighboring Pakistan, Iran, Tajikistan, Uzbekistan and Turkmenistan.

The nation's drainage system is largely landlocked.

Vegetation
The characteristic distribution of vegetation on the mountains of Afghanistan is worthy of attention. The great mass of it is confined to the main ranges and their immediate offshoots, whilst on the more distant and terminal prolongations it is almost entirely absent; in fact, these are naked rock and stone. On the Safed Koh alpine range itself and its immediate branches, at a height of  there is abundant growth of large forest trees, among which conifers are the most noble and prominent, such as Cedrus deodara, Abies excelsa, Pinus longifolia, Pinus pinaster, Stone pine (the edible pine, although this species is probably introduced, since it is original to Spain and Portugal) and the larch. There is also the yew, the hazel, juniper, walnut, wild peach and almond. Growing under the shade of these are several varieties of rose, honeysuckle, currant, gooseberry, hawthorn, rhododendron and a luxuriant herbage, among which the ranunculus family is important for frequency and number of genera. The lemon and wild vine are also here met with, but are more common on the northern mountains. The walnut and oak (evergreen, holly-leaved and kermes) descend to the secondary heights, where they become mixed with alder, ash, khinjak, Arbor-vitae, juniper, with species of Astragalus. Here also are Indigoferae rind dwarf laburnum.

Down to  there are wild olive, species of rock-rose, wild privet, acacias and mimosas, barberry and Zizyphus; and in the eastern ramifications of the chain, Nannerops ritchiana (which is applied to a variety of useful purposes), Bignonia or trumpet flower, sissu, Salvadora persica, verbena, acanthus, varieties of Gesnerae.

The lowest terminal ridges, especially towards the west, are, as it has been said, naked in aspect. Their scanty vegetation is almost wholly herbal; shrubs are only occasional; trees almost non-existent. Labiate, composite and umbelliferous plants are most common. Ferns and mosses are almost confined to the higher ranges.

In the low brushwood scattered over portions of the dreary plains of the Kandahar tablelands, it is possible to find leguminous thorny plants of the papilionaceous suborder, such as camel-thorn (Hedysarum alhagi), Astragalus in several varieties, spiny rest-harrow (Ononis spinosa), the fibrous roots of which often serve as a tooth-brush; plants of the sub-order Mimosae, as the sensitive mimosa; a plant of the rue family, called by the natives lipad; the common wormwood; also certain orchids, and several species of Salsola. The rue and wormwood are in general use as domestic medicines—the former for rheumatism and neuralgia; the latter in fever, debility and dyspepsia, as well as for a vermifuge. The lipad, owing to its heavy nauseous odour, is believed to keep off evil spirits. In some places, occupying the sides and hollows of ravines, it is found the Rose Bay, called in Persian khar-zarah, or ass-bane, the wild laburnum and various Indigoferae.

In the last several decades, 90% of forests in Afghanistan have been destroyed and much of the timber has been exported to neighboring Pakistan. As a result, large percent of Afghanistan's land could be subject to soil erosion and desertification. On the positive note, the Karzai administration and international organizations are helping counter this problem by often planting millions of saplings. Afghanistan had a 2018 Forest Landscape Integrity Index mean score of 8.85/10, ranking it 15th globally out of 172 countries.

See also

Environmental issues in Afghanistan
Provinces of Afghanistan

References

Further reading
 Federal Research Division, Library of Congress. 1997. "Afghanistan: A Country Sturdy".

External links

Topographic map of Afghanistan (1 : 300 000)
Persia (Iran), Afghanistan and Baluchistan is a map from 1897
Afghanistan, Beloochistan, etc. is a map from 1893 created by the American Methodist Church